Cameron Robert Burgess (born 21 October 1995) is a professional footballer who plays as a centre-back or left-back for Ipswich Town. Born in Scotland, he is a former youth international for Australia.

Early life
Burgess's grandfather is Scottish retired international footballer Campbell Forsyth. His father, Stuart Burgess, was also a professional player. His family emigrated from Scotland to Perth, Australia when he was 11 years old.

Club career

Fulham and loans
Burgess joined the Fulham Academy in 2011 from ECU Joondalup and signed a professional contract with the club in July 2013. He made his first team debut for Fulham, in a 2–1 away loss in the opening match of the 2014–15 Championship season on 9 August 2014 against Ipswich Town at Portman Road.

On 15 January 2015, Burgess signed a contract extension with Fulham until June 2017, with an option for another year, and on the same day signed on loan for Scottish Premiership club Ross County until the end of the 2014–15 season.

Burgess joined Cheltenham Town of the National League on loan on 26 January 2016 for the remainder of the 2015–16 season.

On 18 July 2016, Burgess joined League One club Oldham Athletic on a six-month loan deal. He made his debut on 6 August 2016 in a 3–0 loss to Millwall. He scored his first goal for Oldham in a 1–1 draw with Oxford United on 10 December 2016.

On 6 January 2017, he moved to Bury on loan for six months.

Scunthorpe United
On 6 June 2017, Burgess joined Scunthorpe United on a three-year contract. He scored his first goal for the club in a 0–3 away win over Northampton Town.

On 24 July 2019 he joined Salford City on a season-long loan.

Accrington Stanley
On 3 August 2020 he joined Accrington Stanley on a 3-year deal. He scored on his debut for Accrington in an EFL Cup tie against Burton Albion. He also scored on his second appearance in an EFL Trophy tie against Leeds United U21s.

Ipswich Town
On 15 August 2021, Burgess joined EFL League One club Ipswich Town on a three-year contract for an undisclosed fee, with the contract having the option for an additional one-year extension. He made his debut for Ipswich two days later in a 1–2 away loss against former loan club Cheltenham Town.

International career

Scotland
Burgess played for Scotland at under-18 and under-19 levels and took part in the 2014 UEFA European Under-19 Championship qualification campaign, playing the full game against Latvia in a 1–1 draw.

Australia
In September 2014 Burgess switched his allegiance permanently to Australia. He was named in the Australia squad for the 2014 AFC U-19 Championship held in Myanmar.

16 March 2015, Burgess was selected as one of twelve overseas based players in a squad of twenty three by head-coach, Aurelio Vidmar, to take part in the Australian Olyroos' qualification campaign on the road to Brazil 2016 Olympic Games. The first stage of qualification began in a tournament held in Kaohsiung City, Taiwan, against minnows Hong Kong, Myanmar and hosts Taiwan. The Olyroos progressed past this qualification tournmanet to qualify for the AFC U-23 Championship, which doubles as the final qualification round for the AFC for the Olympics. On 23 December 2015, Burgess was again selected by Vidmar to form part of the Olyroos squad for the 2016 AFC U-23 Championship held in Doha, Qatar between 14 and 30 January 2016.

Career statistics

Honours
Cheltenham Town
National League: 2015–16

Salford City
EFL Trophy: 2019–20

See also
List of foreign Football League Championship players
List of Fulham F.C. players (1–24 appearances)
List of Scottish football families
List of sportspeople who competed for more than one nation

References

External links

1995 births
Living people
Footballers from Aberdeen
Australian soccer players
Australia youth international soccer players
Scottish footballers
Scotland youth international footballers
Scottish emigrants to Australia
Expatriate soccer players in Australia
Association football defenders
Perth RedStar FC players
Fulham F.C. players
Ross County F.C. players
Cheltenham Town F.C. players
Oldham Athletic A.F.C. players
Bury F.C. players
Scunthorpe United F.C. players
Salford City F.C. players
Accrington Stanley F.C. players
Ipswich Town F.C. players
English Football League players
National League (English football) players